Waimiha was a flag station on the North Island Main Trunk line, in the Ruapehu District of New Zealand, serving the small village of Waimiha in the Ōngarue valley. Its site covered , with a shelter shed, platform, cart approach and loading bank. A goods shed was added about 1910. A passing loop could hold 42 wagons, extended to 80 wagons by 1980. The passing loop is still in use.

The rails reached Waimiha about Christmas 1900 and by 28 May 1901 it was reported that goods for workmen were being carried on the ballast trains. A railway worker's cottage was in place by 1902 and a house for second porter was mentioned in 1912. In 1913 a tramway link was agreed. In 1921 Rangataua Timber Co advertised for tenders for a mile of tramway. A telephone was connected in 1915. Further houses were built in the 1920s. From 20 June 1981 the station was unstaffed.

References

External links 
Photos -

Train near Waimiha in 2016
Steam train near Waimiha

Railway stations in New Zealand
Ruapehu District
Rail transport in Manawatū-Whanganui
Buildings and structures in Manawatū-Whanganui
Railway stations opened in 1903
Railway stations closed in 1986